Bizia is a genus of moths in the family Geometridae.

Species
 Bizia grandinaria (Motschulsky, 1860)

References
 Bizia at Markku Savela's Lepidoptera and Some Other Life Forms
Natural History Museum Lepidoptera genus database

Gnophini